The Mercedes-Benz DTM V8 engine is a prototype, four-stroke, 4.0-liter, naturally aspirated V-8 racing engines, developed and produced by Mercedes-Benz for the Deutsche Tourenwagen Masters, between 2000 and 2018.

Engine
It is a 90-degree V8 engine with four-valves per cylinder, uses indirect fuel injection, and has 2 x 28 mm air restrictors due to regulations.

Applications
AMG-Mercedes CLK-DTM
Mercedes-Benz AMG C-Class DTM (W203)
Mercedes-Benz AMG C-Class DTM (W204)
Mercedes-AMG C-Coupé DTM

References

Mercedes-Benz
V8 engines
Mercedes-Benz engines
Gasoline engines by model
Engines by model
Piston engines
Internal combustion engine